Sanchai and Sonchat Ratiwatana of Thailand were the defending champions and successfully defended their title, defeating Francis Casey Alcantara and Ruben Gonzales of the Philippines in the final, 6–4, 2–6, [10–7].

Lý Hoàng Nam and Nguyễn Hoàng Thiên of Vietnam, and Kittipong Wachiramanowong and Wishaya Trongcharoenchaikul of Thailand won the bronze medals.

Medalists

Seeds

Draw

Finals

Top half

Bottom half

References 
 Draw

Men's Doubles